Island Davaar or Davaar Island is located at the mouth of Campbeltown Loch off the east coast of Kintyre, in Argyll and Bute, Scotland. It is a tidal island, linked to the mainland by a natural shingle causeway called the Dhorlin near Campbeltown at low tide. The crossing can be made in around 40 minutes.

History
Davaar was known as the island of Sanct Barre between the years 1449 to 1508. The modern form Davaar is from older Do Bharre – thy St Barre. Dr Gillies in his "Place Names of Argyll" appears to accept the popular derivation, Double-pointed (Da-Bharr) Island.

In 1854,  was built on the north of the island by the lighthouse engineers David and Thomas Stevenson. The lighthouse was automated in 1983, and today, Davaar is inhabited by the caretakers of the Island who run the holiday cottages and oversee the farming activities including Rare breed sheep, Highland Cattle and goats.

The Lookout, a square building standing on a small knoll close to the lighthouse, was built during World War II to house naval crews, whose task it was to stretch anti-submarine nets across the water, protecting Campbeltown. During this time it was known as the Signal Station.  It has been restored and tastefully converted into a unique place to stay.

The island is also known for its seven caves, one of which contains a life size cave painting depicting the crucifixion, painted in 1887 by local artist Archibald MacKinnon after he had a vision in a dream suggesting him to do so. The painting caused uproar in the area as it was seen as a sign from God; it is said that when the townsfolk discovered it was MacKinnon, and not God, he was exiled from the town indefinitely. Restored several times since, including twice by the original artist, the painting was vandalised in July 2006, having a red and black depiction of Che Guevara painted over the original masterpiece. It has since been restored again.

Davaar Island is one of 43 tidal islands that can be walked to from the mainland of Great Britain and one of 17 that can be walked to from the Scottish mainland.

Davaar Island is owned by Kildalloig Estate, and forms part of the farming enterprise.

Staying on Davaar Island 
There are four holiday cottages and cabins available for visitors to stay on Davaar Island.   The Lookout (WWII Signal Station) and The Principal Lighthouse Keeper's Cottage have been sympathetically converted into holiday cottages and in 2021 two glamping cabins were constructed on the east side of Davaar.

Stamps
Local stamps were issued for Davaar in the 1960s. The stamps served the many visitors to the island who wished to have their mail posted there, and carried by the boatman to the nearest GPO Post Box at Campbeltown on the mainland. The boatman service ended some time in the early 1970s. Postage Rates were double those of the UK.

See also
 List of lighthouses in Scotland
 List of Northern Lighthouse Board lighthouses

References

External links
 
 Northern Lighthouse Board

Islands of the Clyde
Tidal islands of Scotland
Uninhabited islands of Argyll and Bute